State Route 342 (SR 342) is a short state highway in Nevada, United States.  It is a loop route of State Route 341, running north through the communities of Silver City and Gold Hill before returning to State Route 341 near Virginia City. This highway is a historic route, dating back to the Comstock Lode of the 1860s. The highway loosely parallels, and crosses, the route of the Virginia and Truckee Railroad. Prior to renumbering in the 1970s this route was known as State Route 80.

Route description

SR 342 is the original and shorter of the two routes between Silver City and Virginia City. However, trucks are required to use newer alignment (SR 341) due to 15% grades and hairpin curves. The route begins just south of Gold Hill, at the junction with SR 341. Both routes have Virginia City listed as the first control city, however all trucks are directed to use SR 341 instead of SR 342. The highway runs through narrow Gold Canyon for its entire length. This highway serves as the main street of Gold Hill and Silver City. While in Silver City the highway crosses the Virginia and Truckee Railroad, now a heritage railroad that once served as a primary route to transport silver from the mines in Virginia City.

History
This highway was the principal highway between Virginia City and Carson City and has been in use since the Comstock Lode of the 1860s. The highway has appeared on Nevada highway maps since at least as far back as 1919 and was first numbered part of Nevada State Route 17 (modern State Route 341) sometime in the 1920s. The 1937 edition of the official Nevada Highway Map was the first to show both routes between Virginia City and Silver City, with both routes numbered 17. The 1949 edition showed separate numbers for the two routes, with the older route now numbered 80. It retained the 80 designation at least to 1979, before being renumbered route 342.

Major intersections

Mileposts in Nevada reset at county lines; the start and end mileposts are given in the county column.

See also

References

External links

 
 Nevada State Route 342 @ AARoads

342
Transportation in Lyon County, Nevada
Transportation in Storey County, Nevada